Radosław Romanik (born 16 January 1967 in Kamienna Góra) is a Polish former professional road cyclist.

Major results

1993
1st Overall Bałtyk–Karkonosze Tour
1994
1st Overall Bałtyk–Karkonosze Tour
1995
1st Overall Bałtyk–Karkonosze Tour
1996
1st Overall Bałtyk–Karkonosze Tour
1997
1st Stage 1 TV Wisła Tour
2000
1st Stage 5a Bałtyk–Karkonosze Tour
2001
1st  Road race, National Road Championships
2nd Overall Bałtyk–Karkonosze Tour
1st Stage 7
3rd Overall Peace Race
2002
1st Overall Małopolski Wyścig Górski
1st Overall Course de la Solidarité Olympique
3rd Overall Bałtyk–Karkonosze Tour
2003
3rd Overall Małopolski Wyścig Górski
1st Stage 4
2004
1st Stage 4 Tour de Beauce
3rd Overall Settimana Ciclistica Lombarda
2005
1st Coupe des Carpathes
1st Overall Bałtyk–Karkonosze Tour
1st Stage 5
1st GP Jasnej Góry
1st Ogólnopolski Wyścig z Okazji Dnia Dziecka
1st Stage 2 Małopolski Wyścig Górski
2nd Szlakiem Grodów Piastowskich
3rd Overall Małopolski Wyścig Górski
2006
1st Overall Okolo Slovenska
1st Stage 4a
2nd Grand Prix Hydraulika Mikolasek
2007
1st Stage 6 Bałtyk–Karkonosze Tour
2nd Overall Małopolski Wyścig Górski
2008
1st Overall Bałtyk–Karkonosze Tour
1st Stage 5 Dookoła Mazowsza (TTT)
2nd Puchar Ministra Obrony Narodowej
2009
3rd Overall Course de la Solidarité Olympique
2011
2nd Puchar Ministra Obrony Narodowej

References

1967 births
Living people
Polish male cyclists
Cyclists at the 2004 Summer Olympics
Olympic cyclists of Poland
People from Kamienna Góra
Sportspeople from Lower Silesian Voivodeship